"I Became a Prostitute" (listed as "I Became a..." on radio station promos) is a song by Scottish indie rock band The Twilight Sad. The song was released as the first single from the band's second studio album, Forget the Night Ahead. It was released on 3 August 2009 on Fat Cat Records.

The title of the song is "a metaphor for becoming something that you don't want to be, you can see it happening but there is nothing you can do about it." Guitarist Andy MacFarlane notes that:

Track listing

Credits
 James Alexander Graham – vocals
 Andy MacFarlane – guitar
 Craig Orzel – bass
 Mark Devine – drums
 Produced by Andy MacFarlane
 Co-produced by Mark Devine and Paul Savage
 Recorded and mixed by Paul Savage
 Mastered by Alan Douches
 dlt – artwork

References

External links
 Single synopsis at Fat Cat Records

2009 singles
The Twilight Sad songs
2009 songs